Wakita (written: 脇田) is a Japanese surname. Notable people with the surname include:

, Japanese historian
, Japanese professional wrestler, better known by his stage name Super Delfin
Susumu Wakita (born 1947), Japanese golfer
, Japanese bobsledder

Japanese-language surnames